The Punta Ramiere (in Italian) or Bric Froid (in French) is a mountain in the Cottian Alps belonging to the department of Hautes-Alpes (FR) and the province of Turin (IT). It's the highest peak of the long stretch of the Po/Rhone water divide starting from the Aiguille de Scolette (north) and ending with the Monviso group (south).

Geography 
The Ramiere is the tripoint at which the borders of the Italian comunes of Sauze di Cesana and Cesana and the French commune of Abries meet.

The geodetic point of the Italian Military Geographic Institute named Punta Ramiere (code 066104) is defined on the top of the mountain.

SOIUSA classification 
According to SOIUSA (International Standardized Mountain Subdivision of the Alps) the mountain can be classified in the following way:
 main part = Western Alps
 major sector = North Western Alps
 section = Cottian Alps
 subsection = Central Cottian Alps
 supergroup = (It:Catena Bric Froid-Rochebrune-Beal Traversier/Fr:Chaîne Bric Froid-Rochebrune-Beal Traversier ) 
 group = (It:Gruppo Ramiere-Merciantaira/Fr:Groupe Bric Froid-Grand Glaiza) 
 subgroup = (It:Gruppo della Ramiere/Fr:Crête du Bric Froid) 
 code = I/A-4.II-B.4.a

Access to the summit
The easiest route for the summit starts from Colle Ramiere (Ramiere pass, 3,007 m) and reaches the mountain top by its northwestern ridge. The pass can be attained by foothpat from the Thuras valley (Cesana Torinese) or the Argentiera valley (Sauze di Cesana).

Nature conservation 
The Punta Ramiere is located on the northern border of the French regional nature park of Queyras (Parc naturel régional du Queyras ), established in 1977.

References

Maps
 Italian official cartography (Istituto Geografico Militare - IGM); on-line version: www.pcn.minambiente.it
 French  official cartography (Institut géographique national - IGN); on-line version:  www.geoportail.fr

External links 
 Punta Ramiere: 360° panoramic image from the summit on pano.ica-net.it

Alpine three-thousanders
Mountains of Piedmont
Mountains of the Alps
Froid
France–Italy border
International mountains of Europe